Guilt Redeemed is a 1915 Swedish silent drama film directed by Victor Sjöström.

Cast
 Lili Bech as Margaret Stensson
 Gustaf Callmén as Hennis far, hemmansägare
 Carlo Wieth as Hennis bror
 John Ekman as Fabrikschef
 Viggo Friderichsen as Albin Ström, ingenjör
 August Warberg as Hemmansägare
 Greta Almroth as Hans dotter
 Stina Berg as Hans hustru

References

External links

1915 films
1915 drama films
1910s Swedish-language films
Swedish black-and-white films
Swedish silent films
Films directed by Victor Sjöström
Swedish drama films
Silent drama films